Internal Combustion is the third studio album by Society Burning, released on October 10, 2010 by Audiocomm International. The album was available to download for free between January 5 and 22 of 2012 exclusively.

Reception 
Fabryka Music Magazine gave Internal Combustion four out of four possible stars and commended the band for keeping their cold wave roots intact while successfully fusing classic rock, dark wave, industrial, electronic and classical music. LemonWire called the album "15 tracks of harsh electro industrial rock" and "sometimes overpowering, other times atmospheric and open, the tracks still retain the signature sound."

Track listing

Personnel 
Adapted from the Internal Combustion liner notes.

Society Burning
 Boom Fernandez (as Boom chr Paige) – synthesizer, guitar, production, cover art, design
 Dave Mansfield (as Dave Creadeau) – vocals, synthesizer, production, cover art, design

Additional performers
 Joe Abraham – vocal production (3)
 Produkt – remixing (16)
 UCNX – Remix (17)

Production and additional personnel
 Terry Beck – photography
 Mt. Lepper – photography

Release history

References

External links 
 Internal Combustion at Bandcamp
 Internal Combustion at Discogs (list of releases)

2010 albums
Society Burning albums